"Hot 'n' Nasty" is the sixth single by English rock outfit Humble Pie, one of the first supergroups of the 1960s-'70s. Released in 1972, the song peaked at #52 on the US Billboard Hot 100 singles chart and #35 in Canada.  The B-side is "You're So Good for Me".

The song appears on their fifth studio album, Smokin', also released in 1972.

Personnel
Steve Marriott - Lead Vocals, backing vocals Hammond Organ, piano
Clem Clempson - guitar.
Greg Ridley - bass guitar.
Jerry Shirley - Drums.
Stephen Stills-  backing vocals only (Guest musician)

Covers
Superfly - B-side of Hello Hello

References

External links
Humble Pie.net

1972 singles
Humble Pie (band) songs
Songs written by Steve Marriott
1972 songs
A&M Records singles